is a Japanese billionaire entrepreneur and art collector. He founded Start Today in 1998 and launched the online fashion retail website Zozotown in 2004, now Japan's largest. Most recently, Maezawa introduced a custom-fit apparel brand ZOZO and at-home measurement system, the ZOZOSUIT, in 2018. As of December 2021, he is estimated by Forbes to have a net worth of $2.0 billion.

Early life
Maezawa began attending Waseda Jitsugyo High School in 1991, where he started a hardcore punk band with his classmates called , in which he was the drummer. The band released their first EP in 1993. After graduating from high school, he decided not to go to college; instead he moved to the US with a girlfriend, where he started collecting CDs and records. When he returned to Japan in 1995, his album collection became the basis for his first company, which sold imported albums and CDs through the mail.

Business

In 1998, Maezawa used the basis of the mail-order album business to launch the company Start Today. The same year, his band signed with the label BMG Japan. By 2000, Start Today had moved to an online platform, had begun selling clothing, and had become a public company. In 2001, Maezawa declared a hiatus on his music career. Start Today opened the retail clothing website Zozotown in 2004, and six years later, Start Today became a publicly traded company, listed on the "Mothers" Index of the Tokyo Stock Exchange. By 2012, Start Today was listed in the First Section of the Tokyo Stock Exchange.

In 2018, Maezawa introduced ZOZO, a custom-fit clothing brand and the ZOZOSUIT, an at-home measurement system, in over 72 countries and territories.

He also sold 30% of his personal stake in ZoZo to Yahoo Japan.

Contemporary Art Foundation
Maezawa is the founder of the Tokyo-based Contemporary Art Foundation, which he started in 2012 with a goal of "supporting young artists as a pillar of the next generation of contemporary art." The Contemporary Art Foundation currently hosts collection shows twice a year. In May 2016, Maezawa attracted significant media attention with a record purchase price at auction of $57.3 million for an Untitled (1982) artwork of a devil by Jean-Michel Basquiat, and broke a record again in May 2017 with a $110.5 million auction for another Untitled (1982) of a skull by the same artist. At the same 2016 auction, Maezawa bought pieces by Bruce Nauman, Alexander Calder, Richard Prince, and Jeff Koons, spending a total of $98 million over two days. Maezawa plans to open a contemporary art museum in Chiba, which will house his collection.

Spaceflights

Announced circumlunar flight

On 17 September 2018, it was announced that Maezawa will be the first commercial passenger to do a flyby around the Moon. He will fly on board a SpaceX Starship, which has been in development since 2017. The flight is slated to take place no earlier than 2023 with a duration of nearly six days. He originally planned to take six to eight artists with him as a part of an art project he has created entitled #dearMoon. However, in March 2021, Maezawa changed the requirement to members of the public. Finally, in December 2022, Maezawa announced that he had chosen his crew members, and had selected them as the group of his favorite artists, such as DJ Steve Aoki and T.O.P.

ISS mission
On 13 May 2021, Maezawa announced he would be joining Space Adventures on a trip to the International Space Station in December 2021, via a Soyuz spacecraft. He spent 12 days on the orbital station with his assistant, Yozo Hirano, where he completed the top 100 things demanded by public, as well as recorded highlights in preparation for the SpaceX lunar flight.

The flight lifted off on 8 December 2021, from Baikonur Cosmodrome in Kazakhstan as part of the Russian-operated Soyuz MS-20. On 18 December, Maezawa announced that he will start a campaign in which every participant will receive a sum of money "from space." The campaign started on 19 December. He returned as planned on 20 December.

Most retweeted
On 5 January 2019, Maezawa successfully secured the most ever retweets for his Twitter message offering one million yen (approx US$9300) each to 100 randomly selected people who retweeted the message and followed him. More than four million people ended up retweeting Maezawa's tweet and following him.

Later that year, on 31 December, he secured the second spot in the list of most-retweeted tweets by offering one million yen (approx US$9200) each to 1000 randomly selected people who retweeted the Twitter message and followed him. The message surpassed the 3 million retweet's mark.

Personal life
He is divorced, with one child, and lives in Chiba, Japan.

References

1975 births
Living people
People from Kamagaya
Japanese billionaires
People from Chiba Prefecture
20th-century Japanese businesspeople
21st-century Japanese businesspeople
Japanese art collectors
Space tourists
Japanese astronauts